The 1894–95 season was the 22nd Scottish football season in which Dumbarton competed at national level, entering the Scottish Football League and the Scottish Cup. In addition Dumbarton played in the Dumbartonshire Cup.

Story of the Season

August
On 11 August Dumbarton travelled down the coast to open Somerset Park for the season and came away with a 1-1 draw.

The first real test for the new look Dumbarton team came a week later with a visit to Ibrox in the league. Rangers ran out easy 3-0 winners, but it was not all gloom as the result may have been different but for the lack of a Dumbarton striker.

September
After a free week, Dumbarton entertained Leith Athletic in the league and recorded their first win by 3-2. Leith however were not aided by an injury to one of their players requiring them to play with a man short for most of the second half.

On 8 September it was a trip north for a league match against Dundee and after holding their own in the first half it was the home side who triumphed 3-0.

A week later St Bernards were entertained at Boghead and after well contested game it was the visitors who left with both points after a 4-3 win.

On 22 September, Dumbarton travelled to Paisley to play St Mirren in the league.  Goal scoring was no problem but it would be their old colleague John Taylor who did the damage by scoring a hat-trick for the Saints in a second 4-3 defeat in a row.

The run of defeats continued a week later when unbeaten league leaders  Hearts left Boghead having inflicted a crushing 4-1 defeat on the Dumbarton men. 

So at the end of September Hearts led the league with 10 points from 5 matches, followed by Rangers with the same number of points from 6 games.  Dumbarton lagged at the bottom along with Leith and Third Lanark with just one win to show from 6 games.

October
After a free week, Dundee came to Boghead to fulfil the return league fixture and unfortunately the result was no different with a 4-2 defeat being suffered. As in previous weeks the problem seemed to be staying power as Dumbarton led 2-1 going into the second half.  In addition an injury to D Thomson required yet a further call on the 2nd XI with James Hartley being the newest recruit so far.

The downward spiral continued on 13 October when a visit to Parkhead finished in a 6-0 thrashing from Celtic.

And it was no different the following week where Dumbarton continued their travels, this time to Tynecastle, and suffered a 3-1 defeat to unbeaten Hearts.

At the end of October Hearts were running away at the top of the league unbeaten with 18 points from 9 games followed by Rangers with 12 points from 8 games.  Dumbarton were marooned at the bottom with 2 points to show from their 9 games.

November
A home game at Boghead on 3 November against Clyde brought some hope of a return to winning ways, but things were against Dumbarton from the start as Tom McMillan was missing due to injury requiring a shuffling of the pack. As it happened his defensive skills were much missed as Clyde left with a 2-1 victory.

The return of McMillan a week later against Third Lanark at Cathkin Park did little to stem the run of bad results and Dumbarton left having suffered a 6-3 beating. Again it was a case of holding their own until the latter stages of the game before tiring badly. It proved however to be Tom McMillan's final appearance for the club - during his ten seasons he set a record of 111 appearances in all national competitive matches.

On 17 November Dumbarton travelled to Cappielow in a friendly against Second Division Morton. The match was evenly contested but finished in a 2-1 victory for the home side.

A week later there was a welcome relief from the league with Dumbarton’s first tie in the Scottish Cup. However this was no walkover with the visit of Ayrshire side Galston who had already a few scalps to their name in the competition. Being his 100th appearance for Dumbarton, McLeod switched to striker with 2nd XI player, Robert Colquhoun replacing him as goalkeeper, and while his effect up front was ineffectual, Dumbarton managed to scramble a 2-1 win. 

The league at the end of November looked more and more like Hearts for the taking with 11 wins from 11 games, Rangers trailing 8 points behind, though with 2 games less played.  Dumbarton sat at the bottom with their solitary win.

December
The first Saturday in December saw a return to league duty and the daunting visit of Rangers to Boghead. Rangers were trying their best to keep pace with league leaders Hearts but on Dumbarton’s side was the fact that Rangers had not yet won a league match at Boghead. As it was Rangers wait would be extended for a further season with Dumbarton pulling off an incredible 1-0 victory.

On 8 December Dumbarton carried forward their new found confidence with a friendly win at Alexandria against Vale of Leven by 3-1.

The mini revival came to an end the following weekend with a 2-1 second round Scottish Cup defeat against King’s Park at Stirling. The task was more challenging than would have been the case with the loss of Tom McMillan and yet another 2nd XI debutant, George Jackson, taking his place in the team.

Things went from bad to worse on 23 December when Dumbarton returned from Edinburgh having suffered a 5-0 league thrashing from St Bernards.

On the last day of the year Dumbarton played a friendly at Tontine Park against neighbours Renton and came away with a 2-1 win.

The league at the end of 1894 still looked like a stroll for Hearts, though having tasted defeat for the first time, they headed Rangers by 6 points with 6 games to play. Dumbarton were joined at the bottom by Leith Athletic both with 2 wins.

January
The first two weekends in January saw little football due to frost, but on 19 January Dumbarton and Vale of Leven turned out to play the semi final of the county cup at Boghead. The state of the pitch was still considered unplayable by the referee, nevertheless a friendly was played which ended in a 1-1 draw.

The weather put paid to the rest of the month.

February
Whilst freezing conditions continued to play havoc with club matches, William Thomson played for the Scottish League XI against the Irish League in Belfast on 2 February – the Scots winning 4-1.

March
Dumbarton returned to competitive football for the first time in over two months on 2 March but the tale of woe continued with another league defeat this time to Third Lanark at Bognead losing 4-2. Again it was a case of the Dumbarton men failing to last the pace as they held their opponents at 2-2 till late in the game.

Another home league game was played a week later this time against Celtic and while the result was yet another defeat the scoreline of 2-0 reflected the stiff resistance put up by the home side.

The league game against Clyde on 16 March was another of those which had marked most of the season – Dumbarton having most of the play – 1-0 up at half time – then fell away as the game went on – eventually losing 3-1.

After a free week Dumbarton played their penultimate league match against St Mirren at Boghead on 30 March. As had been the case for most of the season Dumbarton put on agreat show in the first half and led 2-0 – but unlike the rest of the season this time they maintained their form and ran out 4-1 winners.

So at the end of March – Hearts having long ago secured the championship, the only matter to be decided in the league was who would join Dumbarton and Leith Athletic in the bottom 3 places and be subject to the dreaded election process for relegation.

April
The final league game of the season took place on 6 April against fellow strugglers Leith Athletic in Edinburgh. A win would see Dumbarton lift themselves off the bottom of the table but this would be a hard ask as not a single point had been earned away from Boghead all season. As it was the result was a 1-1 draw and both clubs finished on equal records.

The Easter weekend was spent across the border where Dumbarton played friendlies against Arsenal on 13 April and Chatham two days later losing 5-1 and 3-2 respectively. 

On 20 April while Dumbarton had a rest weekend, neighbours Renton aimed to follow up their success ten years earlier with a win in the Scottish Cup final against St Bernards. It would a big ask of the Second Division side and it was the capital side who walked away with the cup after a close 2-1 win. 

The last game of the month saw Dumbarton entertain Vale of Leven in the semi final of the Dumbartonshire Cup and achieved a well-earned 5-0 victory.

May
On 4 May Dumbarton travelled to Aberdeen to play a friendly against Orion and in an evenly contested match the home side won 3-2.

With the county cup final fixed for the 25th, a practice match was played against junior side Dunipace which Dumbarton won comfortably 4-1.

And so the final game of the season saw Dumbarton come up against the Scottish Cup runners up Renton for ownership of the county cup and it was Dumbarton who kept a tight grip on the trophy for the seventh year in a row with a 2-1 win.

June
The season ended on a positive note as Dumbarton retained their First Division status in the league elections on 3 June – results were as follows:

Match results

Scottish League

Scottish Cup

Dumbartonshire Cup

Friendlies/Benefits

Player statistics
At the start of their second 'professional' season, Dumbarton were struck immediately by mass desertions not only across the border but to fellow league clubs who could afford to pay more for talented players. So before season 1894-95 has started, Dumbarton had lost the services of Billy Andrews to Bolton Wanderers, Lawrence Bell to Third Lanark, Bob Ferrier to Sheffield Wednesday, Alf Smith to Third Lanark, John Taylor to St Mirren and Albert Saunderson to Stoke.

So at the start of the season the first XI started out with a number of new faces, and coming into the team were Tom Keir (full back); Hugh Craig (right wing); William Forsyth and William Boyle (centre forwards) and James Gracie (left wing) all promoted from the second XI.

|}

Source:

Reserve team
Dumbarton lost in the first round of the Scottish Second XI Cup to Queen's Park.

References

Dumbarton F.C. seasons
Scottish football clubs 1894–95 season